Viña del Mar, Chile was the second leg of the 2013-14 South American Beach Volleyball Circuit, the tournament was held February 7–9, 2014.

32 teams participated in the event (16 per gender). Argentina took gold in both male and female categories, for the men, Julian Azaad and Ian Mehamed won their first South American title while 2012 Olympian Ana Gallay and Georgina Klug took gold in the women's competition.

Women's Competition

Participating teams

 ARG1 Ana Gallay–Georgina Klug
 ARG2 Julieta Puntin–Cecilia Peralta
 BOL Marxia Reyes–Diva Oropeza
 BRA1 Thais Ferreira–Fabiola Constancio
 BRA2 Karine Monte–Rafaela Fares
 CHI1 Camila Pazdirek–Francesca Rivas
 CHI2 Pilar Mardones–Saniela Burgos
 CHI3 María Elena Salas–Josefina Vélez
 COL Andrea Galindo–Claudia Galindo
 PAR Michelle Valiente–Gabriela Filippo
 PER1 Mishell Serna–Alinson Vela
 PER2 Katia García–Michelle Mogollon
 URU1 Lucía Guigou–Eugenia Nieto
 URU2 Lia Fortunati–Victoria Aguirre
 VEN1 Norisbeth Agudo–Gabriela Brito
 VEN2 Yetsi Lezama–Milagros Hernández

Pools

Pool A

|}

|}

Pool B

|}

|}

Pool C

|}

|}

Pool D

|}

|}

Championship bracket

Quarterfinals

|}

Semifinals

|}

Third-place match

|}

Final

|}

Ranking

Men's Competition

Participating teams

 ARG1 Julian Azaad–Ian Mehamed
 ARG2 Facundo del Coto–Pablo Bianchi
 BOL Israel Martínez–Sergio Franco
 BRA1 Allison Francioni–Gustavo Carvalhaes
 BRA2 Marcio Gaudie Ley–Saymon Barbosa
 CHI1 Esteban Grimalt–Marco Grimalt
 CHI2 Cristobal Martínez–Rodrigo Salinas
 CHI3 Javier Daga–Matias Tovar
 COL Yhan Cuesta–Diego Corredor
 PAR Luis Riveros–Mauricio Brizuela
 PER1 Williams Maldonado–Roger Rengifo
 PER2 Luis Bramont–Jimy Heredia
 URU1 Renzo Cairus–Nicolás Zanotta
 URU2 Andrés Stoll–Martín Molina
 VEN1 Jesús Villafañe–Igor Hernández
 VEN2 Jackson Henríquez–Carlos Rangel

Pools

Pool A

|}

|}

Pool B

|}

|}

Pool C

|}

|}

Pool D

|}

|}

Championship bracket

Quarterfinals

|}

Semifinals

|}

Third-place match

|}

Final

|}

Ranking

Ranking after first stop

Women

Men

References

2014 in beach volleyball
South American Beach Volleyball Circuit 2013-14